Diego Mexía Felípez de Guzmán y Dávila, 1st Marquess of Leganés (1580–1655) was a Spanish politician and army commander.

Biography
Diego was the youngest son of Diego Velázquez Dávila y Bracamonte, Marquess of Loriana, and Leonor de Gúzman, aunt of the Count-Duke of Olivares.

Beginning in 1600, Diego fought during more than 20 years in the Spanish Netherlands in the service of Albert VII, Archduke of Austria. After the Archduke's death, Diego returned to Spain where his cousin Olivares had become valido, and under his patronage, Diego soon became very influential.

Diego became a member of the State Council in 1626, was made Marquess of Leganés in 1627 and married in the same year with Polixena Spinola, the very rich daughter of the great general Ambrosio Spinola.

In 1627 Diego was sent back to Flanders to force the States General to accept Olivares' project of the Unión de Armas, and pay for an extra 12,000 infantry soldiers. On his way back, he and general Ambrosio Spinola visited the Siege of La Rochelle by the French, on which occasion they discussed the succession of the Duchy of Mantua, which would eventually lead to the War of the Mantuan Succession.

After this mission, Diego held several important political and military posts in the Spanish Netherlands, which earned him the title of Grandee of Spain in 1634.

On 24 September 1635 Diego was named Captain General and Governor of the Duchy of Milan, and was soon involved in the Franco-Spanish War (1635) and the Piedmontese Civil War against France, Parma, Mantua and Savoy. He besieged Odoardo Farnese, Duke of Parma and Piacenza and, with pressure from Pope Urban VIII, forced him to sign a peace treaty in 1637.  Diego also prevented the French to take the Valtellina and won some victories against Savoy.

In 1638 Diego conquered Breme and Vercelli, and launched the next year a great offensive against Piedmont. He conquered a large number of cities, but suffered a great defeat near Casale and failed in the Siege of Turin (1640).

Diego was called back to Spain and in November 1641 given the command of the army of Catalonia to push back the French and Catalan troops in the Catalan Revolt.

After some initial successes in defending Tarragona, Diego suffered a defeat in the Battle of Lerida (1642), which made him fall from grace.

In 1645 Diego was rehabilitated and made nominal Viceroy of Catalonia where he defended successfully the city of Lérida in 1646. He remained viceroy until 1648.

Diego spent the last years of his life in Italy as president of the council of Italy.

Marriage and children
First he married Polixena Spinola (died 1639), daughter of Ambrosio Spinola. They had two children :
Gaspar Felípez de Guzmán y Spinola, 2nd Marquess of Leganés (died 1666), governor of Oran and Viceroy of Valencia.
Father of Diego Dávila Mesía y Guzmán, 3rd Marquess of Leganés (died 1711). 
Ambrosio Ignacio Mexía Felípez de Guzmán y Spinola (1632–1684), tutor of Balthasar Charles, Prince of Asturias and Archbishop.

He next married Juana Fernández de Córdoba y Rojas, daughter of Luis Fernández de Córdoba, 6th Duke of Sessa.

Art collector
The Marquess of Leganés was also one of the greatest art collectors of his time, he is said to have owned a total of 1.330 paintings. He was also painted by Anthony van Dyck, a painting  which today can be found in the Banco Santander Foundation in Madrid.

Further reading
 (see index, v.1, for information about his art collecting).

References

Sources

External links

 Retrato de Diego Felipez de Guzmán, Marquess of Leganés, his biography in Spanish from 1791.

1580 births
1655 deaths
Marquesses of Spain
Viceroys of Catalonia
Viscounts of Spain
Spanish generals
Spanish politicians
Military personnel of the Franco-Spanish War (1635–1659)
Spanish nobility